Elani is a girl's name. The name means light and pacesetter. It's a variation of the name Eleanor. 

Elani may refer to:

 Elani (band), Kenyan band
 Elani Landman, South African squash player